Noviherbaspirillum massiliense is a bacterium from the genus of Noviherbaspirillum which has been isolated from human faeces.

References

External links
Type strain of Noviherbaspirillum massiliense at BacDive -  the Bacterial Diversity Metadatabase

Burkholderiales
Bacteria described in 2014